Trabboch Castle (NS 458 221) is a ruined L-plan tower house in the old Barony of Trabboch, Parish of Stair, East Ayrshire, Scotland.

History

The Barony and lairds
The lands of Trabboch (pronounced 'Traaboch') are first recorded by name in a rental of 1303-4. King Robert the Bruce gave the 'L-plan' castle to the Boyds of Kilmarnock for services rendered at the Battle of Bannockburn in 1314, as revealed in an undated charter in the Register of the Great Seal, stating that King Robert I granted the 'lands of Trebach' in Kyle-Regis to Robert Boyd. Following the fall from favour of the Boyds in 1469 Paterson records that the fortalice of Trabach was forfeited to the crown, reportedly for the use of the eldest sons of the Kings of Scotland. The RCAHMS state By 1451 the lands had passed into the hands of William, Earl of Douglas and later to the Boswells of Auchinleck. In the 17th century Chalmers of Gadgirth and Reid of Barskimming held parts of the Barony of Trabboch. Love states that the Arthurs, Lord Ochiltree, and the Campbells of Loudoun also held Trabboch Castle.

As the caput of the Barony of Trabboch a moot hill would have existed and although no remains survive the nearby farm of Lawhill is suggestive of the location. The associated Mill of Trabboch stood on the Water of Coyle and was not powered by the loch waters.

Campbell sees Trabboch Castle as the only survivor of a defensive chain of castles that once ran across Kyle Regis and included Stair, Auchencloigh, Drongan, and Drumsuie.

The remnants and the castle
The remains of Trabboch Castle in 1954 consisted of an L-shaped portion of walling, with no windows or doors apparent, possibly sitting on a motte. The walls are 2.5m thick, with a height around 3.0m, constructed of massive rubble masonry, 9.0m long on the north-western section and 12.5m long on the south-western section. No window or door openings are visible. A broad natural ditch is visible on the western side and the shallow curvilinear ditch on the south side may have been part of the castle defences. Some finds were held by the proprietor of Trabboch Farm. Much of the castle stone was used to build the nearby Trabboch Mains Farm. The castle ruins are now protected as a scheduled monument.

A grave was found nearby (NS 458 221), placed beneath a cairn and cut out of the solid red sandstone, covered by a flagstone and containing some beads and blackish dust.

James Boswell of Auchinleck is recorded to have said that "I wish that my father would buy Trabboch mains, a beautiful farm now offered for sale by Sir John Whitefoord, as it was the very manor-place of the barony of Trabboch, and still has the vestigia of the old house still to be seen."

Cartographic evidence
Gordon's map of 1636-52 shows Trabboch castle. Roy's map of 1747 marks both Trabog (Sic) and Lawhill Molls map of 1745 marks the castle. John Thomson's 1828 map marks Traboch Castle (Sic) clearly.

Loch of Trabboch

The ancient Loch of Trabboch was a site where swans, moor hens, and other waterfowl nested and as a site within the old Barony of Trabboch it was an area used for hunting and fishing by the laird. Trabboch Loch is a 19th-century site formed from the flooding of Drumdow pit.

References
Notes

 Sources

 Adamson, Archibald R. (1879). Rambles through the Land of Burns. Kilmarnock : Dunlop & Drennan.
 Barber, Derek (2000). Steps through Stair. Stair Parish Church. 
 Campbell, Thorbjørn (2003). Ayrshire. A Historical Guide. Edinburgh : Birlinn. 
 Coventry, Martin (2010). Castles of the Clans. Musselburgh : Goblinshead. 
 Davis, Michael C. (1991). The Castles and Mansions of Ayrshire. Ardrishaig : Spindrift Press
 
 Love, Dane (2003). Ayrshire : Discovering a County. Ayr : Fort Publishing. .
 Paterson, James (1863–66). History of the Counties of Ayr and Wigton. V. 2 - Part 2 - Kyle. Edinburgh: J. Stillie.
 Smith, John (1895). Prehistoric Man in Ayrshire. London : Elliot Stock.

External links
 Video footage of Trabboch Castle
 Clan boyd and Trabboch Castle

Lochs of East Ayrshire
History of East Ayrshire
Castles in East Ayrshire
Scheduled Ancient Monuments in East Ayrshire
Tower houses in Scotland